Timothy John Boham also known as Marcus Allen (born May 27, 1981), is a former gay pornographic film actor who was convicted in 2009 of the first-degree shooting death of 43-year-old Denver businessman John Paul "J P" Kelso.

Porn career as "Marcus Allen"

In November 2002, Boham appeared on the cover of Freshmen magazine (a magazine focusing on 18- to 25-year-old gay men). In the annual survey in 2003, Marcus Allen was voted "Freshman of the Year" by a wide margin, and again appeared on the cover (June 2003). This led to opportunities such as with Falcon studios.

With Falcon Entertainment, Boham appeared in a dozen adult movies under the name "Marcus Allen" in 2004 and 2005. He was also in Channel I Releasing/Rascal Entertainment's "Never Been Touched" by Chi Chi LaRue. As Marcus Allen, Boham was on the cover of Mandate magazine in July 2006, apparently for All World's Video. Boham also appeared on the cover of Playgirl Magazine's "campus hunks" issue (November 2006) (and is advertised as "John" of Denver, Colorado, and as having a "smooth body and 'softer' side", p. 32–34).

Downward spiral
The Advocate reported that Boham left porn about a year before the murder and went to live in Denver, eventually working for John Paul "J P" Kelso but only for about 10 days before failing to show up for his job.  Kelso was co-owner of a Denver debt recovery business called Professional Recovery Systems; he was a philanthropist "... giving away hundreds of thousands of dollars to charities around the world...." and was openly gay.  Co-workers at the debt recovery business described Tim as "... bright and... [that] it seemed like he had his mind on something else."

Murder of Kelso
A housekeeper found Kelso, 43, shot to death in the bathtub of his upscale Congress Park home on November 13, 2006. The police named Boham as a suspect in the slaying.  Boham was arrested on November 16 at the Mexico-U.S. border in Lukeville, Arizona, after identifying himself as the subject of a murder warrant to Customs and Border officers. He was extradited to Colorado and held without bond.

During [Boham's preliminary hearing], Denver Detective Aaron Lopez testified that in a jailhouse interview in Arizona, where Boham was arrested Nov. 16, Boham said Kelso had asked him to go into the master bedroom to cuddle. But Boham, who said he needed money for his girlfriend, had other plans, Lopez testified. Boham also cut open the safe and found no money in it, the detective said.

According to the Denver Post, Boham told his family that he killed Kelso because he believed that Kelso kept a lot of money in his household safe.  "Court documents claim that Boham had bipolar disorder and was prone to fits of rage, and that he told his mother that he had planned to use the money to go to South America with his girlfriend." But Boham said his plan went awry when Kelso refused to open the safe, and there was a brief struggle during which he accidentally shot Kelso, according to the Post.  "Lopez said that Boham confessed to both his sister and mother before leaving for Arizona. Before leaving, he repeatedly returned to Kelso's home to clean it up, in hopes that his fingerprints and DNA wouldn't be discovered."."

Trial
His trial for murder started with jury selection June 1, 2009.

He was found guilty June 9, 2009, and sentenced to life in prison without the possibility of parole.

See also 
 List of pornographic movie studios
List of male performers in gay porn films

Footnotes

References
Affidavit for Arrest, hosted on CourtTV.com

Further reading
Rocky Mountain News, 10 May 2007
Intended For Mature Audiences: The Rise and Deadly Spiral Of Adult Film Star Timothy J. Boham By: Donna Thomas W & B Publishers 2014 

American people convicted of murder
People convicted of murder by Colorado
1981 births
Living people
American prisoners sentenced to life imprisonment
Prisoners sentenced to life imprisonment by Colorado
People extradited within the United States
LGBT people from Colorado